Idania del Río (born 1981) is a Cuban designer and graphic artist based in Havana, Cuba. She attended the Instituto Superior de Diseño Industrial (Higher Institute of Industrial Design) in Havana and graduated with a degree in Graphic Design and Visual Communication in 2004. Del Río's poster art has been featured in Cuban and international exhibitions, including designer Daniel Ryan Smith's 2007-2008 Seattle-Havana Poster Show, and Cuban curator Agapito Martínez's 2009 Ghost Posters and 2011 Últimas Escenas exhibits.

Del Río opened Clandestina, the first independently run Cuban design shop, in Old Havana with Spanish business partner Leire Fernández in February 2015. She was part of a group of Cuban business owners which met with U.S. President Barack Obama during his visit to Havana in April 2016.  Del Rio and Clandestina were covered in the documentary "StartUp Cuba Episode 6: Clandestina - Cuba's First Independent Fashion Brand".

Work 
Idania del Rio is part of a new wave in Cuba, an independent entrepreneur. An established artist, her idea was simple but incredibly effective: selling T-shirts, handbags, posters and more with a unique slant on modern Cuban life.Many of the clothes and cushion covers carry their line's increasingly recognisable slogans: "Actually I'm in Havana" and "99% diseño cubano" (99% Cuban design).Clandestina may be a small shop but they have big dreams. They're already in talks with a business partner in New York about selling their products outside the island.

Founded in 2015 by designer Idania Del Rio, Clandestina is Cuba's first clothing brand, and a unique collective of designers, artists, and creators. All the products are designed by a team of artists based in Old Havana, sourced from whatever we can find, made wherever we need to make them, and brought to you however we can.

Now, Clandestina is also the first Cuban brand to sell online to the rest of the world. Our products are designed in Cuba, but they are sourced, made and sold in the USA.

References

Cuban designers
Cuban women artists
Living people
1981 births